"Angry All the Time" is a song written by Bruce Robison and first recorded on his 1998 album Wrapped. It was later covered by Tim McGraw with guest vocals from his wife Faith Hill. Released in July 2001, McGraw's version was the second single from his Set This Circus Down album. The song reached Number One on the Billboard Hot Country Singles & Tracks (now Hot Country Songs) chart.

Content
The song is a ballad in which the narrator talks about the relationship unraveling.

Critical reception
Deborah Evans Price, of Billboard magazine reviewed the song favorably calling it one of the best ballads of the year. She also says that McGraw's voice "oozes hurt and disillusionment." Kevin John Coyne of Country Universe gave the song an A− grade, saying that the song begins "with the sound of hushed acoustic strumming, the arrangement picks up force as the song progresses, but the focus of attention remains the story of a marriage gradually unraveling. He goes on to say that the song "all comes through in McGraw’s evocative performance, showcasing the layers of subtlety his voice had picked up in the years since his 'Indian Outlaw' days, while wife Faith Hill’s plaintive background vocals add a further layer of pathos."

Chart performance
"Angry All the Time" debuted at #48 on the U.S. Billboard Hot Country Singles & Tracks chart for the week of July 28, 2001.

Year-end charts

References

1998 songs
2001 singles
Bruce Robison songs
Tim McGraw songs
Songs written by Bruce Robison
Song recordings produced by Byron Gallimore
Song recordings produced by Tim McGraw
Song recordings produced by James Stroud
Curb Records singles
Country ballads